The 2019 Kogi State House of Assembly election was held on March 9, 2019, to elect members of the Kogi State House of Assembly in Nigeria. All the 25 seats were up for election in the Kogi State House of Assembly.

Results

Yagba West 
APC candidate Aderonke Aro won the election.

Yagba East 
APC candidate Musa Jimoh won the election.

Omala 
APC candidate Musa Attai Hilarion Collins won the election.

Olamaboro 
APC candidate Ujah Azewo Anthony won the election.

Okene II 
APC candidate Ahmed Dahiru won the election.

Okene I 
APC candidate Mohammed Lawi Ahmed won the election.

Okehi 
APC candidate Muktar Bajeh won the election.

Ogori/Magongo 
APC candidate Akande Oke Moses won the election.

Ofu 
APC candidate Amodu Seidu Shehu won the election.

Mopa-Muro 
APC candidate Ademola Bello won the election.

Lokoja II 
APC candidate Ndako Idris Muhammed won the election.

Lokoja I 
APC candidate Umar Isa Tanimu won the election.

Koton-Karfe 
APC candidate Abubakar Muhammed Tanko won the election.

Kabba/Bunu 
APC candidate Kolawole Olushola Mattew won the election.

Ijumu 
APC candidate Kilani Olusola Olumo won the election.

Igalamela/Odolu 
APC candidate Atabor Henry Cosmas won the election.

Idah 
APC candidate Suleiman Attajachi Musa won the election.

Ibaji 
APC candidate John Monday Ugada Abah won the election.

Okura 
APC candidate Enema Paul won the election.

Dekina/Biraidu 
APC candidate Moses Edoko Ododo won the election.

Bassa 
APC candidate Daniya Ranyi won the election.

Ankpa II 
APC candidate Alfa Momoh Rabiu won the election.

Ankpa I 
APC candidate Ahmed Mohammed won the election.

Ajaokuta 
APC candidate Bello Hassan Abdullahi won the election.

Adavi 
APC candidate Ibrahim Usman won the election.

References 

2019 Nigerian House of Assembly elections
2019 Kogi State elections